Lake Laberge is an electoral district which returns a member (known as an MLA) to the Legislative Assembly of the Yukon Territory in Canada. It is one of the Yukon's eight rural districts and is named after the eponymous Lake Laberge, which is within the riding.

Lake Laberge encompasses the Whitehorse subdivisions of MacPherson, and Hidden Valley, as well as the residents of the Takhini Hot Springs Road, Pilot Mountain, the Hamlet of Ibex Valley, and the North Klondike Highway and Lake Laberge as far as Braeburn Lodge. The riding is also part of the traditional territory of the Little Salmon/Carmacks First Nation, the Champagne and Aishihik First Nations, the Kwanlin Dün First Nation, and the Ta'an Kwach'an Council. It is bordered by the rural ridings of Mayo-Tatchun, Kluane, and Pelly-Nisutlin, as well as the Whitehorse ridings Porter Creek North and Riverdale North.

The riding is considered a Yukon Party stronghold.

Members of the Legislative Assembly

Electoral results

2021 general election

2016 general election

|-

| Liberal
| Alan Young
| align="right"| 342
| align="right"| 28.5%
| align="right"| +12.9%

| NDP
| Anne Tayler
| align="right"| 261
| align="right"| 21.8%
| align="right"| -10.7%

|-
! align=left colspan=3|Total
! align=right| 1199
! align=right| 100.0%
! align=right| –
|}

2011 general election

|-

| NDP
| Frank Turner
| align="right"| 330
| align="right"| 32.5%
| align="right"| +17.5%

| Liberal
| Mike Simon
| align="right"| 159
| align="right"| 15.6%
| align="right"| -12.1%
|-
! align=left colspan=3|Total
! align=right| 1017
! align=right| 100.0%
! align=right| –
|}

2006 general election

|-

| Liberal
| John Breen
| align="right"|221
| align="right"|27.6%
| align="right"|+1.5%

| NDP
| Nina Sutherland
| align="right"|120
| align="right"|15.0%
| align="right"|-3.0%
|-
! align=left colspan=3|Total
! align=right|799
! align=right|100.0%
! align=right| –
|}

2002 general election

|-

| Liberal
| Pam Buckway
| align="right"|218
| align="right"|26.1%
| align="right"|-22.4%

| NDP
| Bill Commins
| align="right"|150
| align="right"|18.0%
| align="right"|+0.8%
|-
! align=left colspan=3|Total
! align=right|834
! align=right|100.0%
! align=right| –
|}

2000 general election

|-

| Liberal
| Pam Buckway
| align="right"|514
| align="right"|48.5%
| align="right"|+2.6%

| NDP
| Gary LeGoffe
| align="right"|182
| align="right"|17.2%
| align="right"|-0.8%
|-
! align=left colspan=3|Total
! align=right|1059
! align=right|100.0%
! align=right| –
|}

1999 by-election

}

| Liberal
| Pam Buckway
| align="right"|459
| align="right"|45.9%
| align="right"|+24.2%

| NDP
| Graham McDonald
| align="right"|180
| align="right"|18.0%
| align="right"|-11.4%
|-
! align=left colspan=3|Total
! align=right|1000
! align=right|100.0%
! align=right| –
|}

1996 general election

|-

| NDP
| Doug Livingston
| align="right"|328
| align="right"|29.4%
| align="right"|+9.6%

| Liberal
| Linda Biensch
| align="right"|242
| align="right"|21.7%
| align="right"|+0.1%

| Independent
| Mark Bain
| align="right"|221
| align="right"|19.8%
| align="right"|+19.8%
|-
! align=left colspan=3|Total
! align=right|1116
! align=right|100.0%
! align=right| –
|}

1992 general election

|-

| Independent
| Chris Gladish
| align="right"| 223
| align="right"| 23.0%
| align="right"| –

| Liberal
| Bonnie Hurlock
| align="right"| 210
| align="right"| 21.6%
| align="right"| –

| NDP
| Sandra Gibbs
| align="right"| 192
| align="right"| 19.8%
| align="right"| –

|-
! align=left colspan=3|Total
! align=right| 970
! align=right| 100.0%
! align=right| –
|}

References

Yukon territorial electoral districts